Llewellyn "Yo" Murphy (born May 11, 1971) is a former gridiron football player of multiple professional leagues.  He was originally signed by the BC Lions in the Canadian Football League (CFL) as an undrafted free agent in 1993; he played college football at Idaho.

Early years
Murphy played high school football at Idaho Falls High School and graduated in 1989.

College career
Murphy played college football at the University of Idaho in Moscow. One of the top pass-catchers in Idaho history, he nabbed 140 receptions during his Vandal career and gained 2,267 yards through the air. Murphy's career receptions rank seventh in Idaho history, while his yards rank fourth and his 17 career receiving touchdowns are tied for fifth. His best year was as a senior in 1992, when he was chosen first-team All-American by three publications, earned first-team All-Big Sky honors and Idaho Most Valuable Offensive Player honors. That season, he was second in Division I-AA with 68 grabs for 1,156 yards and nine touchdowns.

Professional career

BC Lions
In 1993, he was signed by the BC Lions where he won the 1994 Grey Cup.

Scottish Claymores
Between 1995 and 1999, he starred at WR for the Scottish Claymores of NFL Europe. In 1996, he was named World Bowl MVP.

Tampa Bay Buccaneers
In 1999, he would play for the Tampa Bay Buccaneers as a wide receiver and on special teams.

Minnesota Vikings
Murphy also played for the Minnesota Vikings of the National Football League in 1999.

Las Vegas Outlaws
In 2001, Murphy played for the Las Vegas Outlaws of the XFL.

St. Louis Rams
Murphy signed with the St. Louis Rams of the NFL in 2001, where he went on to play in the Super Bowl. He caught a game tying touchdown pass from Kurt Warner in a 20-17 loss in Super Bowl XXXVI

Kansas City Chiefs
Murphy signed with the Kansas City Chiefs on December 17, 2002. He was inactive for one game before being released on December 27.

Ottawa Renegades
He signed with the Ottawa Renegades in 2003.

Saskatchewan Roughriders
He went undrafted in the 2006 CFL Dispersal Draft after the suspension of the Renegades' franchise, but signed with the Saskatchewan Roughriders in September 2006. He culminated his career as a member of the Riders' Grey Cup winning team in 2007.

Retirement
On November 28, 2007, it was announced that Murphy had retired from professional football. Murphy is the only player ever to play in the regular seasons of the CFL, NFL, XFL and NFL Europe, as well as the only player to suit up for the Super Bowl, Grey Cup and World Bowl championship games.

Murphy is currently the co-owner of Performance Compound in Tampa, Florida, and was married in November 2014.

References

External links
University of Idaho Athletics Hall of Fame – Yo Murphy

1971 births
Living people
American football wide receivers
American players of Canadian football
Canadian football wide receivers
Idaho Vandals football players
BC Lions players
Scottish Claymores players
Tampa Bay Buccaneers players
Minnesota Vikings players
Las Vegas Outlaws (XFL) players
St. Louis Rams players
Kansas City Chiefs players
Ottawa Renegades players
Saskatchewan Roughriders players
World Bowl MVPs
Players of American football from Idaho
Players of American football from Los Angeles
Players of Canadian football from Los Angeles